Amanda Root (born 1963) is an English stage and screen actress and a former voice actress for children's programmes.

Root is known for her starring role in the 1995 BBC film adaptation of Jane Austen's Persuasion, her role in the British TV comedy All About Me, as Miranda, alongside Richard Lumsden in 2004, and for voicing Sophie in The BFG.

She trained for the stage at Webber Douglas Academy of Dramatic Art.

Life and career
Root was born in Chelmsford, Essex. She began her career at the Leeds Playhouse in 1983 when she played Essie in Bernard Shaw's The Devil's Disciple.
She was a remarkably complete actress even in her early twenties, when physically she looked little more than a child. With her dark soulful eyes she could command a stage, and the Royal Shakespeare Company saw her talent very early on.
She worked regularly with the RSC in Stratford-upon-Avon and London from 1983 to 1991, including playing the role of Juliet to Daniel Day-Lewis's Romeo; a very young Lady Macbeth; Cressida to Ralph Fiennes's Troilus, and Rosaline to his Berowne.

In 1995, she starred as Anne Elliot in Persuasion, co-starring Ciarán Hinds and John Woodvine. The film (made for TV, then released in cinemas) was based on the novel by Jane Austen and was her first leading role in a film.

She won rave reviews (and was nominated for a Tony Award) in October 2008 for her portrayal of the control freak Sarah in The Old Vic's revival of Alan Ayckbourn's interlinked trilogy The Norman Conquests, directed in the round by Matthew Warchus.

Audio
She was the voice of Sophie in the animated film of Roald Dahl's The BFG (1989).

She portrayed Joan la Pucelle in the Arkangel Shakespeare's 2000 production of Henry VI, Part 1.

In 2006, Root undertook the task of recording an unabridged audiobook of Charlotte Brontë's Jane Eyre. Published by Naxos it has a running time of 20 hours 30 minutes, spread across 17 audio CDs: . She had previously recorded an abridged 3-hour reading of Jane Austen's Persuasion, published by Hodder & Stoughton Audiobooks in July 2004: .

In November 2007 for BBC Radio 4 she played in the Woman's Hour Drama serial adaptation of F. Tennyson Jesse's novel A Pin to See the Peep Show, and on 2 December 2007 was heard in Arnold Wesker's 75-minute radio play The Rocking Horse, commissioned by the BBC World Service to celebrate its 75th anniversary. As part of the BBC Radio 4 Hopes and Desires season, she played Lindsey, an incurable romantic who yearns to meet a modern-day Heathcliff, in Nick Warburton's 30-minute comedy Catching Heathcliff, broadcast at 11 pm on 15 January 2008. She was the voice of Fanny in the 2-cassette 1997 BBC radio dramatisation of Jane Austen's Mansfield Park.

Theatre
Her stage credits include:
 Essie in The Devil's Disciple (Bernard Shaw), Leeds Playhouse, 1983
 Juliet in Romeo and Juliet and Hermia in A Midsummer Night's Dream, RSC small-scale tour 1983; The Other Place 1984
 Jessica in The Merchant of Venice, RSC Royal Shakespeare Theatre, 1984
 Moth in Love's Labours Lost, RSC Royal Shakespeare Theatre, 1984
 Lucy Ellison in Today by Robert Holman, RSC The Other Place, October 1984; The Pit Barbican Centre, May 1985
 Apricot in The Dragon's Tail by Douglas Watkinson, Apollo Theatre, October 1985
 Neuroza in Tell Me Honestly (Kenneth Branagh), Not the RSC Festival, Almeida Theatre 1985
 Adela in The House of Bernarda Alba (Federico García Lorca, directed by Núria Espert), Lyric Hammersmith, September 1986; Globe Theatre, January 1987
 Harriet in The Man of Mode (George Etherege), RSC Swan Theatre, July 1988; The Pit, April 1989
 Lady Macbeth in Macbeth, RSC Barbican Theatre, May 1989
 Betty McNeil in Some Americans Abroad (Richard Nelson), RSC The Pit, July 1989
 Cordelia in King Lear, RSC Almeida Theatre. September 1989
 Cressida in Troilus and Cressida, RSC Swan Theatre, April 1990; The Pit, June 1991
 Rosaline in Love's Labours Lost RSC Royal Shakespeare Theatre, September 1990; Barbican Theatre, March 1991
 Nina in The Seagull (Anton Chekhov), RSC Swan Theatre; November 1990; Barbican Theatre July 1991
 Cleopatra in Caesar and Cleopatra (Shaw), co-starring with Alec McCowen, Greenwich Theatre, February 1992
 The Manageress in 50 Revolutions (Murray Gold), Oxford Stage Company, Whitehall Theatre, September 1999
 Edith in Conversations After a Burial (Yasmina Reza), Almeida Theatre, September 2000
 Polina Bardin in Enemies (Maxim Gorky in a version by David Hare), Almeida Theatre, May 2006
 Sarah in The Norman Conquests, an interlinked trilogy by Alan Ayckbourn, Old Vic, October 2008
 Hester Collyer in The Deep Blue Sea (Terence Rattigan), Chichester Festival Theatre, July 2011

Filmography

Film

Television

References

 Theatre Record and its annual Indexes

External links
 

1963 births
Alumni of the Webber Douglas Academy of Dramatic Art
English television actresses
English stage actresses
Living people
Royal Shakespeare Company members
Actresses from Essex
Actors from Chelmsford
20th-century English actresses
21st-century English actresses
English film actresses
English radio actresses
English voice actresses
Audiobook narrators